Tiarella trifoliata, the three-leaf foamflower, is a species of flowering plant in the family Saxifragaceae. The specific name trifoliata means "having three leaflets", a characteristic of two of the three recognized varieties. Also known as the laceflower or sugar-scoop, the species is found in shaded, moist woods in western North America.

Description
Tiarella trifoliata is a perennial dicotyledonous herb that flowers in the late spring. The flowers are bell-shaped, white and solitary forming an elongated, leafless panicle. The calyx lobes are 1.5–2.5 mm and petals are 3–4 mm. Basal leaves are 15–80 mm long and up to 120 mm wide, trifoliate or palmately 3- to 5-lobed. Cauline leaves are infrequent and much smaller.

The typical variety of Tiarella trifoliata (var. trifoliata) has petiolate leaves with three leaflets per leaf (i.e., trifoliate). The cut-leaved foamflower (var. laciniata) also has trifoliate leaves with petioles, but unlike the typical variety, it has deep lobes more than half the length of the leaflet. The one-leaf foamflower (var. unifoliata) has sessile, simple leaves (rarely trifoliate).

Taxonomy
Tiarella trifoliata was first described by the Swedish botanist Carl Linnaeus in 1753. Its type specimen was collected by Georg Steller on Cape St. Elias, Kayak Island, Alaska in 1742, but that specimen is now lost. A specimen collected from Sitka, Alaska has been designated as the neotype for this species.

In 1832, William Hooker described two additional species of Tiarella in western North America (T. laciniata and T. unifoliata), including two hand-drawn illustrations in his description. John Torrey and Asa Gray recognized all three species (T. trifoliata, T. laciniata, T. unifoliata) in their treatment of genus Tiarella in 1840.

In 1905, Per Axel Rydberg described T. californica based on an earlier description of a species thought to belong to genus Heuchera. All four species (T. trifoliata, T. laciniata, T. unifoliata, T. californica) were included in a taxonomy proposed by Olga Lakela in 1937.

Based on Hooker's species description, William Efner Wheelock renamed T. laciniata  as a variety of Tiarella trifoliata (var. laciniata) in 1896. Similarly, Federico Kurtz renamed T. unifoliata  as Tiarella trifoliata var. unifoliata in 1894. Flora of North America recognized the varieties (var. laciniata and var. unifoliata) in an influential treatment of genus Tiarella published in 2009. , the varieties (not the species) are widely recognized:

 Tiarella trifoliata 
 Tiarella trifoliata var. laciniata  (synonym: T. laciniata )
 Tiarella trifoliata var. trifoliata
 Tiarella trifoliata var. unifoliata  (synonym: T. unifoliata )

Likewise Tiarella californica  is considered to be a synonym of T, trifoliata var. laciniata.

Distribution
It ranges from northern California through western Canada northward to Alaska, and eastward to Montana. Within this region, the varieties of T. trifoliata have overlapping ranges:

 Tiarella trifoliata var. laciniata: British Columbia; Oregon, Washington
 Tiarella trifoliata var. trifoliata: Alberta, British Columbia; Alaska, California, Idaho, Montana, Oregon, Washington
 Tiarella trifoliata var. unifoliata: Alberta, British Columbia; Alaska, California, Idaho, Montana, Oregon, Washington

T. trifoliata var. trifoliata and T. trifoliata var. unifoliata range north to Alaska, while T. trifoliata var. laciniata only ranges as far north as Vancouver Island in British Columbia.

Conservation
The conservation status of Tiarella trifoliata is globally secure (G5). Each variety is secure as well.

References

Bibliography

External links

Calflora
Jepson Flora Project (1993): Tiarella trifoliata

trifoliata
Flora of California
Flora of the Northwestern United States
Flora of Western Canada
Flora of the Klamath Mountains
Natural history of the California Coast Ranges
Natural history of the San Francisco Bay Area
Plants described in 1753
Taxa named by Carl Linnaeus
Garden plants of North America